Nateby is a civil parish in the Wyre district of Lancashire, England. It contains four listed buildings that are recorded in the National Heritage List for England.  All the listed buildings are designated at Grade II, the lowest of the three grades, which is applied to "buildings of national importance and special interest".  The parish contains the village of Nateby and the surrounding countryside. The Lancaster Canal passes through the parish, and a bridge crossing it is listed.  The other listed buildings are a country house and associated structures, and a farmhouse.


Buildings

References

Citations

Sources

Lists of listed buildings in Lancashire
Buildings and structures in the Borough of Wyre